Honinbō Genjō (本因坊元丈; 1775–1832) was a professional Go player.

Biography 
Genjō was the eleventh Hon'inbō. His rival and great friend was Yasui Chitoku, who had advanced to 8 dan at the same time as Genjō. Both were at the level of Meijin strength, but their respect for each other was so great, neither took the Meijin post, since there could only be one Meijin.

Notes
 - This information was found here.

1775 births
1832 deaths
Japanese Go players
18th-century Go players